Mozammel Haque (born 1 October 1946) is a Bangladesh Awami League politician and the Minister for Liberation War Affairs of Bangladesh since 2014.

Early life 
Haque was born on 1 October 1946 in Dakhina Khan, Gazipur Sadar Upazila, Gazipur District to Anwar Ali and Rabeya Khatun.

Career 
Haque was a member of the East Pakistan Chhatra League Central Working Committee. He fought in the Bangladesh Liberation war in 1971 and was part of the Mukti Bahini. From 1973 to 1986, he was elected Upazila chairman three times and four times municipal mayor. He was elected to the parliament from Gazipur-1 in 2008. He was elected unopposed from the same constituency in 2014. He acted as the religious minister of Bangladesh from 2018 to 2019. In 2019, he was appointed the Minister for Liberation War Affairs.

Controversy 
In his 1986 book Bangladesh: A Legacy of Blood,  Anthony Mascarenhas wrote Mozammel was involved in a gang-rape of a newlywed wife in 1974:

One day during a combing operation in Tongi area north of Dhaka Major Nasser who was commanding another squadron of the Bengal Lancers, arrested three small-time thugs. In the course of interrogation one of the men broke down and told the army officers a story about a particularly gruesome triple murder which had rocked Tongi the previous winter. It transpired that a newly married couple travelling to their home in a taxi had been waylaid on the outskirts of the town. The bridegroom and the taxi driver were hacked to death and their bodies thrown in the river. The bride, who was carried off to an isolated cottage, was repeatedly raped by her abductors. Three days later her mutilated body was found on the road near a bridge.

   Confessing to his part in the crime, the thug told the army men the police investigation was called off when they found that the ring-leader of the gang was his boss, Muzamil, chairman of the Tongi Awami League. According to Farook, the confession so infuriated the interrogating officer, a boyish lieutenant named Ishtiaq who has since resigned and left the country, that ‘he started kicking the chap so hard that he died of internal injuries.’
 
   Muzamil himself was taken by Major Nasser to Dhaka for prosecution after he had confirmed from police records that the thug had been telling the truth. According to Farook, Muzamil offered Nasser 300,000 Takkas for his release. ‘Don’t make it a public affair,’ the Awami Leaguer advised him. ‘You will anyway have to let me go, either today or tomorrow. So why not take the money and forget about it?’ Nasser, who was affronted by this blatant attempt to bribe him, swore he would bring Muzamil to trial and make him hang for his crime. He handed him over to the civil authorities. Farook said they were all astonished a few days later to find that Muzamil had been released on Shiekh Mujib’s direct intervention. ‘I told you to take the money,’ Muzamil crowed. ‘You would have been the gainers. Now I have been released anyway and you get nothing.’

   The incident shattered Farook and his colleagues. Tongi marked the turning point for them. ‘It seemed as if we were living in a society headed by a criminal organisation. It was as if the Mafia had taken over Bangladesh. We were totally disillusioned. Here was the head of government abetting murder and other extreme things from which he was supposed to protect us. This was not acceptable. We decided he must go.’

   Major Farook wanted to kill Sheikh Mujib that very day. He recalled: ‘I lost my temper. I told Capt. Sharful Hussain “Sharful Hussain. This is absolutely useless. Let’s go and knock off this chap.” He said “Yes Sir. But think about it a bit more.” I said, “All right, I’ll think about it.”’

The incident has been also depicted in novel Deyal by Humayun Ahmed.

References

1946 births
Living people
Awami League politicians
10th Jatiya Sangsad members
11th Jatiya Sangsad members
Liberation War Affairs ministers of Bangladesh
Mukti Bahini personnel
Recipients of the Independence Day Award